Henry Victor Angel Holderness (24 May 1889 – 17 July 1974) was a New Zealand cricketer who played for Otago. He was born and died in Dunedin.

Holderness made a single first-class appearance, during the 1918–19 season, against Southland. Opening the bowling for Otago, he took 5 for 10 and 5 for 29 as he and Arthur Alloo bowled unchanged through the match to dismiss Southland for 41 and 55. Otago won the match by a comfortable margin despite scoring only 94 and 88.

He was wounded in 1915 while serving as a gunner with the New Zealand forces in World War I.

See also
 List of Otago representative cricketers

References

External links
Henry Holderness at CricketArchive

1889 births
1974 deaths
New Zealand cricketers
Otago cricketers
New Zealand military personnel of World War I